Vespasian Warner (April 23, 1842 – March 31, 1925) was a U.S. Representative from Illinois.

Biography
Born in Mount Pleasant (now Farmer City), De Witt County, Illinois, Warner moved with his parents to Clinton, Illinois, in 1843.
He attended public schools in Clinton, and Lombard College in Galesburg, Illinois.
He also studied law in Clinton.
Enlisted as a private in Company E, 12th Regiment, Illinois Volunteer Infantry, June 13, 1861.
He was promoted to sergeant June 23, 1861, second lieutenant February 4, 1862, captain and commissary of subsistence February 10, 1865.
He was brevetted major March 13, 1865, and was mustered out July 13, 1866.
After his military service, he enrolled in the law department of Harvard University, graduating in 1868.  He returned to Illinois the same year to practice law in his hometown of Clinton, Illinois. His law partner was his father-in-law, Clifton H. Moore.

Warner was elected as a Republican to the Fifty-fourth and to the four succeeding Congresses (March 4, 1895 – March 3, 1905).

He served as chairman of the Committee on Revision of the Laws (Fifty-fifth through Fifty-eighth Congresses).

In 1904, Warner ran for Governor of Illinois as a Republican, but he failed to win his party's nomination. The Republican nominee Charles S. Deneen won the general election.  After the election, President Theodore Roosevelt nominated Warner for the job of United States Commissioner of Pensions, heading an agency within the Department of the Interior which was roughly equivalent to today's Department of Veterans Affairs. Warner served from March 4, 1905 until November 25, 1909.

He engaged in business in Clinton, Illinois, as a banker and realty owner and agent. He died in Clinton on March 31, 1925. He was interred in Woodlawn Cemetery.

Vespasian Warner Public Library District
Warner's father-in-law, Clifton H. Moore, was an avid book collector. When Moore died in 1901, he left his collection of books to the city of Clinton, provided a proper library could be constructed to house it. In 1906, Warner donated $25,000 and a plot of land to the city for a public library. The Vespasian Warner Public Library opened to the public in 1908 and continues operation to this day.

References

[1] Vespasian Warner Public Library District Our History http://www.vwarner.org/about-us

External links

 Vespasian Warner Public Library

1842 births
1925 deaths
Union Army officers
Harvard Law School alumni
Republican Party members of the United States House of Representatives from Illinois
People from Farmer City, Illinois
People from Clinton, Illinois
Military personnel from Illinois